Mikko Tapio Savola (born 29 November 1981 in Ähtäri) is a Finnish politician currently serving in the Parliament of Finland for the Centre Party at the Vaasa constituency.

Savola was appointed as interim Minister of Defence on 5 January 2023 after Antti Kaikkonen went on paternal leave. He held the position until Kaikkonen returned on 28 February.

References

1981 births
Living people
People from Ähtäri
Centre Party (Finland) politicians
Members of the Parliament of Finland (2011–15)
Members of the Parliament of Finland (2015–19)
Members of the Parliament of Finland (2019–23)
Ministers of Defence of Finland